The Vedder Mountain is a branch of the Cascade Range in the Pacific Northwest, located at the southeastern edge of the Fraser Lowland in British Columbia, Canada, between the village of Yarrow and the village of Cultus Lake, extending from the Vedder River to the Saar Creek valley.  It separates the broad Fraser Valley and Sumas Prairie in its northwest from the narrow Columbia Valley to its southeast.

A hiking trail crosses the mountain. Old logging roads are also present. Catherwood Logging rail-logged the hill in the 1930s, and both east and west sides were cut with rails coming from Vedder Crossing.

Mountains of British Columbia under 1000 metres
New Westminster Land District